The People's Freedom Party (Nagrik Unmukti Party) is a political party in Nepal.

History

Formation and Registration 

The party was formed under the coordination of Member of House of Representatives, Resham Lal Chaudhary. Due to some acts of law, he could not chair the party, so his wife was chosen as chair instead. He left his former party, the People's Socialist Party, Nepal, claiming that it had become power-centric, forgetting the mandate provided by the citizens whom the leaders only used as a vote bank.

Party expansion and first election 
The party rapidly expanded in a few months in the Tharuhath region. The party surprisingly emerged as largest party of Kailali district winning 4 local levels including two municipalities and two rural municipalities. The party swept away Loktantrik Samajwadi Party, Nepal and People's Socialist Party, Nepal from Tharuhath region keeping their traditional vote block.

List of Members of Parliament

List of Pratinidhi Sabha members from People's Freedom Party

Electoral performance

General election

Provincial election

Local election

See also 

 2021 split in the People's Socialist Party, Nepal 
 Nepali Congress, Madhesh Province
 2015 Tikapur massacre
 Tharu people
 Tharuhat
 2022 Provincial Assembly of Madhesh Province election

References 

Socialist parties in Nepal
Social democratic parties in Nepal
Political parties established in 2022
2022 establishments in Nepal
Nagrik Unmukti Party